The Great Western Railway (GWR) 3600 Class was a class of 2-4-2T side tank steam locomotive, designed by William Dean and built at Swindon in three lots in 1900-1903:

History
Dean had built an experimental 2-4-2T numbered 11, whose success led to the cancellation of another batch of 2-4-0 "Metro" Tanks and the construction of the 3600s in their place. The new 2-4-2Ts had  coupled wheels and  cylinders. The second batch were slightly longer than the prototype, resulting in greater tank capacity, and the third lot, delivered under Churchward, were slightly larger again, and had taper boilers. The class gained the nickname "Birdcage" due to their (for the GWR) unusually spacious cabs.

Use
The 3600 class were fitted with steam reversing gear, steam brakes, and two steam-operated water pick-ups for forward and reverse working. This reflects their intended work as fast suburban engines. About half were employed on such duties in the Birmingham area. The rest worked in the London area, though later a few worked Chester-Birkenhead trains, and some were allocated to South Wales sheds. They were essentially passenger train locomotives, and were eventually superseded by Collett's 2-6-2Ts. All were withdrawn and scrapped between 1930 and 1934.

References

External links 
 3600 'Birdcage' tank class

3600
2-4-2T locomotives
Standard gauge steam locomotives of Great Britain

Scrapped locomotives
Railway locomotives introduced in 1900
Passenger locomotives